Moore Observatory  is an astronomical observatory owned and operated by University of Louisville (U of L). It opened in 1978, and was dedicated to Walter Lee Moore, a Professor of Mathematics at U of L from 1929 to 1967.

Moore Observatory is a research and advanced teaching facility of the University of Louisville. The observatory operates two research telescopes at the site, and a companion telescope at Mount Kent near Toowoomba, Australia. The observatory is located on the  Horner Wildlife Refuge.  The Horner Family donated this land to the U of L in the early 1960s and another  of the original farm surrounds the preserve.

Telescopes

 A  Ritchey–Chrétien telescope manufactured by RC Optical Systems was installed in August 2006.  It is currently used to measure transiting exoplanets.  Other research performed with the telescope includes observing the physical process of nebula.

 A  Ritchey–Chrétien telescope manufactured by RC Optical Systems on a altitude-azimuth mount was added in 2019.  It is primarily used for low Earth orbit (LEO) satellite observations, for near Earth object (NEO) characterization.

 A  modified Dall–Kirkham telescope built by Planewave Instruments is at Mount Kent Observatory in Queensland, Australia. 

 Two identical  modified Dall–Kirkham telescopes at Moore Observatory and at Mount Kent are collaboratively operated by U of L and the University of Southern Queensland (USQ).  They were built by Planewave Instruments and installed in 2006.  They are used for education, public astronomy outreach, and target of opportunity research. The telescopes are interfaced to Internet2, and are operated remotely by students from Kentucky public schools, undergraduate and graduate students at U of L, and students at USQ.  This arrangement allows students to study the southern night sky during the day and the Australian students to study the northern night sky during their day.

See also 
 Morgan–Monroe Observatory
 List of astronomical observatories

References

External links
 Department of Physics and Astronomy at the University of Louisville
 Moore Observatory Clear Sky Clock Forecasts of observing conditions.

Astronomical observatories in Kentucky
University of Louisville
Buildings and structures in Oldham County, Kentucky
Scientific organizations established in 1978
1978 establishments in Kentucky
Buildings and structures completed in 1978